The Arizona Sting was a member of the National Lacrosse League from 2004 to 2007. They played at Nationwide Arena in Columbus, Ohio, from 2001 to 2003 as the Columbus Landsharks. On August 28, 2003, it was announced that the team was relocating to Glendale, Arizona. The team adopted the name Sting in November 2003 and began playing in the Glendale Arena (now Desert Diamond Arena). 

In 2005, the Sting defeated the 2004 NLL champion Calgary Roughnecks to win the franchise's first-ever West Division title. The Sting fell 19-13 to the East Division champion Toronto Rock in the league championships.

On October 16, 2007, the NLL announced that the 2008 season had been cancelled due to the failure of the league and the Professional Lacrosse Players' Association to reach a new collective bargaining agreement. However, the negotiations continued and, on October 25, the league announced that a new seven-year agreement had been reached, and that the season would be played. A new schedule was announced on November 2, 2007, but only included 12 of the expected 14 teams; the Sting and Boston Blazers had been removed. According to a news article posted on the Sting website, 

Prior to the 2009 NLL season, the Arizona Sting ceased operations and its players were put in a dispersal draft.

All time record

Playoff results

* the Arizona Sting hosted the Champion's Cup Finals at Jobing.com Arena. The Knighthawks had the overall top seed in the playoffs, but were unable to host the Championship game due to a scheduling conflict at the Blue Cross Arena.

References

See also
 Arizona Sting seasons
 Arizona Sting players

Defunct National Lacrosse League teams
Sports in Phoenix, Arizona
Sports in Glendale, Arizona
Lacrosse clubs established in 2003
Lacrosse clubs disestablished in 2009
Lacrosse teams in Arizona
2003 establishments in Arizona
2009 disestablishments in Arizona